
Between the Bars (est. 2010) is an American blog that publishes letters from people  held in prison in the United States. The open-source blog platform was developed by Charlie DeTar. The Massachusetts Institute of Technology hosts the website.

The project attempts to provide a communication channel for prisoners who lack access to the internet. Prisoners write letters and send them by postal mail to MIT. Volunteers at MIT then digitize each page and post them on the website in PDF format. As of September 2011, the blog has received, scanned, and posted letters from some 275 inmates in Delano, California; Raiford, Florida; Missouri; New Boston, Texas; Walla Walla, Washington; Boscobel, Wisconsin; and elsewhere in the U.S.

See also
Prison blogs

References

Further reading
Sebastian Matkey. Blogging Behind Bars: How Prison Blogs Revived Prison Literature in the United States. Munich: GRIN Verlag, 2011

External links
Between the Bars website
 Blog Podróżniczy

Blog software
Prison writings
Imprisonment and detention in the United States
Massachusetts Institute of Technology
American blogs
Internet properties established in 2010
Publications established in 2010
Free software projects